James L. Nederlander (born January 23, 1960) is a Broadway theatre owner, operator, producer and presenter. He is the president of the Nederlander Organization, which was founded by his grandfather. He is also a 13-time Tony Award winner and has been nominated 32 other times for Tony Awards.

Biography
Nederlander was born the son of Barbara Smith and James M. Nederlander. He has a wide range of credits; as a theatre owner since 1970 and as a producer since 1984. James Nederlander is a minority owner of the New York Yankees and Florida Panthers.

Nederlander serves on the board of the Fisher Center for Alzheimer's Research Foundation in New York City.

Personal life
In 2008, he married Margo MacNabb at Christ Church United Methodist in New York City.

See also
Nederlander Organization
Detroit Theatre District
Nederlander Theatre

References

External links

1960 births
Living people
American people of Jewish descent
American theatre directors
Theatre owners
Nederlander Organization
Nederlander family